Tinacrucis noroesta is a species of moth of the family Tortricidae. It is found in North America in Arizona, New Mexico, Chihuahua and Durango.

The wingspan is 29–37 mm.

References

Moths described in 2009
Atteriini
Moths of North America